Vusala Hajiyeva (born 3 October 1999) is an Azerbaijani footballer, who plays as a midfielder for the Turkish Women's Super League club  Hatayspor, and the Azerbaijan women's national team.

Club career 
In December 2021, Hajiyeva moved to Turkey and joined the Ankara-based club Fomget G.S. to play in the 2021-22 Turkcell Women's Super League. In the 2022-23 Turkish Super League season, she transferred to Hatayspor.

See also 
List of Azerbaijan women's international footballers

References 

1999 births
Living people
Women's association football midfielders
Azerbaijani women's footballers
Azerbaijan women's international footballers
Russian Women's Football Championship players
Azerbaijani expatriate footballers
Azerbaijani expatriate sportspeople in Russia
Expatriate women's footballers in Russia
Azerbaijani expatriate sportspeople in Turkey
Expatriate women's footballers in Turkey
Turkish Women's Football Super League players
Fomget Gençlik ve Spor players
Hatayspor (women's football) players